The 2010 LSU Tigers baseball team represented Louisiana State University in the NCAA Division I baseball season of 2010. The Tigers played their home games in the new Alex Box Stadium which opened in 2009.

The team was coached by Paul Mainieri who was in his fourth season at LSU. In his first year at LSU, Mainieri's team posted a 29–26–1 record and failed to make the SEC Tournament or the NCAA Tournament, but the Tigers showed great promise during his second year posting a 49–19–1 record while claiming the SEC Western Division Title, SEC Baseball Tournament Championship, and earned the No. 7 National Seed for the 2008 NCAA Tournament.

During his third season, the Tigers were ranked No. 1 in multiple pre-season polls and lived up to the hype. The 2009 LSU Tiger baseball team finished the season 56–17, claiming the SEC regular season title, the SEC Tournament Title, and won the 2009 College World Series to claim the programs 6th National Title.

Previous season 
Paul Mainieri completed his third season as head coach at LSU in 2009. The Tigers won the SEC West division title and the overall SEC regular season title which earned them the No. 1 seed in the 2009 SEC baseball tournament. The Tigers would go on to win the tournament and secure a spot in the NCAA post-season.

After winning the SEC Tournament, it was announced that LSU was selected as a host site for the 2009 NCAA Tournament for the 19th time in the history of the program and for the second consecutive season. When the full NCAA Tournament bracket was released, LSU was awarded the No. 3 national seed in the tournament, guaranteeing them home field advantage throughout the Super Regionals as long as they won the Regional round. LSU was able to sweep the Baton Rouge regional, defeating Southern, Baylor, and Minnesota to secure a spot in the Super Regional round.

Rice won the Houston, TX regional and moved on to the Super Regional to face LSU. LSU continued their winning streak sweeping Rice by the scores of 12–9 and 5–3. The Tigers celebrated the school's 15th trip to the College World Series in what was the final game in the inaugural season of the "new" Alex Box Stadium.

LSU faced Virginia in the first game of the 2009 College World Series. LSU defeated the Cavaliers by a score of 9–5, marking LSU's first opening round win in the College World Series since 2000. In the second game, LSU faced a familiar foe, the Arkansas Razorbacks. LSU dominated the game from start to finish winning 9–1. LSU was 1 game away from making their first trip to the CWS championship since the format changed to a best of 3 series. The Tigers once again faced the Razorbacks, and once again dominated the game. The Tigers sent the Razorbacks home after winning 14–5.

The Tigers were matched up against the Texas Longhorns in the best of 3 series for the national championship. LSU won the first game 7–6, but it took 11 innings for the Tigers to earn the Victory. Texas came back in game 2 and completely dominated the game, defeating the Tigers 5–1. Game 3 set the stage for a winner take all, and the Tigers were ready for the challenge. LSU won the game 11–4 and claimed the 6th national title on school history.

The 2009 squad compiled and overall record of 56–17, including a 10–1 mark in NCAA post-season play.

Pre-Season

2009 Recruiting Class

Key Losses 
 Louis Coleman, P Drafted in Round 5 of the 2009 MLB Draft by the Kansas City Royals
 Chad Jones, P/OF Opted to enter the 2010 NFL Draft
 D. J. LeMahieu, INF Drafted in Round 2 of the 2009 MLB Draft by the Chicago Cubs
 Jared Mitchell, OF Drafted in Round 1 of the 2009 MLB Draft by the Chicago White Sox
 Sean Ochinko, C/INF Drafted in Round 10 of the 2009 MLB Draft by the Toronto Blue Jays
 Ryan Schimpf, INF/OF Drafted in Round 5 of the 2009 MLB Draft by the Toronto Blue Jays

Personnel

2010 roster 

2010 LSU Tigers Baseball Roster & Bios http://www.lsusports.net/SportSelect.dbml?SPSID=27867&SPID=2173&DB_LANG=C&DB_OEM_ID=5200&SORT_ORDER=7&Q_SEASON=2009

Coaching Staff 

2010 LSU Tigers Baseball Coaches & Bios http://www.lsusports.net/SportSelect.dbml?&DB_OEM_ID=5200&SPID=2173&SPSID=28707

Schedule/Results 
{| class="toccolours collapsible" width=95% style="clear:both; text-align:center;"
|- 
! colspan=11 style="background:#461D7C;" | 2010 LSU Tigers baseball game log 
|-
! | 
{| border="1" class="wikitable collapsible collapsed" width="100%" style="font-weight:normal;"
|-
! colspan=11 style="background:#FDD023;" | Regular Season
|-
! | 

{| border="1" class="wikitable collapsible collapsed" width="100%" style="font-weight:normal;"
|-
! colspan="11" | May
|-
! bgcolor="#DDDDFF" width="3%"  | #
! bgcolor="#DDDDFF" width="8%"  | Date
! bgcolor="#DDDDFF" width="13%" | Opponent
! bgcolor="#DDDDFF" width="15%" | Site/stadium
! bgcolor="#DDDDFF" width="5%"  | Score
! bgcolor="#DDDDFF" width="11%" | Win
! bgcolor="#DDDDFF" width="11%" | Loss
! bgcolor="#DDDDFF" width="10%" | Save
! bgcolor="#DDDDFF" width="8%"  | Attendance
! bgcolor="#DDDDFF" width="8%"  | Overall record
! bgcolor="#DDDDFF" width="8%"  | SEC record
|- align="center" bgcolor="#FFE6E6"
| 44 || May 1 || Florida || McKethan Stadium || 3–7 || Randall (5–3) || Matulis (5–2) || None || 4,003 || 32–11 || 11–8
|- align="center" bgcolor="#FFE6E6"
| 45 || May 2 || Florida || McKethan Stadium || 6–13 || Johnson (4–2) || Ott (1–2) || None || 3,617 || 32–13 || 11–10
|- align="center" bgcolor="#D8FFEB"
| 46 || May 4 || Southeastern LA || Alex Box Stadium || 9–5 || Alsup (3–0) || Janway (3–1) || None || 10,692 || 33–13 || 11–10
|- align="center" bgcolor="#D8FFEB"
| 47 || May 7 || Vanderbilt || Alex Box Stadium || 16–15 10 || Ott (2–2) || Brewer (1–2) || None || 10,640 || 34–13 || 12–10
|- align="center" bgcolor="#FFE6E6"
| 48 || May 8 || Vanderbilt || Alex Box Stadium || 2–6 || Hill (5–3)  || Rittiner (4–3) ||  None || 10,909 || 34–14 || 12–11
|- align="center" bgcolor="#FFE6E6"
| 49 || May 9 || Vanderbilt || Alex Box Stadium || 3–4 || Armstrong (6–1) || Ott (2–3) || Gray (1) || 10,304 || 34–15 || 12–12
|- align="center" bgcolor="#FFE6E6"
| 50 || May 14 || Kentucky || Cliff Hagan Stadium || 9–11 || Kapteyn (2–0) || ''Ott (2–4) || None || 2,148 || 34–16 || 12–13
|- align="center" bgcolor="#FFE6E6"
| 51 || May 15 || Kentucky || Cliff Hagan Stadium || 4–9 || Cooper (4–4) || Rittiner (4–4)  || None || 2,279 || 34–17 || 12–14
|- align="center" bgcolor="#FFE6E6"
| 52 || May 16 || Kentucky || Cliff Hagan Stadium || 4–6 || Darnell (5–3) || LaSuzzo (0–1) || None || 2,061 || 34–18 || 12–15
|- align="center" bgcolor="#FFE6E6"
| 53 || May 18 || Tulane || Turchin Stadium || 1–9 || McKenzie (2–1) || Bradshaw (5–1) || None || 4,700 || 34–19 || 12–15
|- align="center" bgcolor="#D8FFEB"
| 54 || May 20 || Mississippi St. || Alex Box Stadium || 14–13 || Ranaudo (3–2) || Reed (1–7) || None || 10,279 || 35–19 || 13–15
|- align="center" bgcolor="#D8FFEB"
| 55 || May 21 || Mississippi St. || Alex Box Stadium || 17–3 || Ross (4–4) || Jones (2–4) || None || 10,831 || 36–19 || 14–15
|- align="center" bgcolor="#FFE6E6"
| 56 || May 22 || Mississippi St. || Alex Box Stadium || 1–2 || Stratton (5–3) || Matulis (5–3) || Graveman (1) || 10,743 || 36–20 || 14–16
|}
|}
|-
! |

|}
*Rankings are based on the team's current ranking in the Baseball America poll the week LSU faced each opponent.

 Game Summaries/Recaps 

 Regular season 

 February 

 March 

 April 

 May 

 Rankings 

 NR = Not Ranked
 ^ Collegiate Baseball ranked 40 teams in their preseason poll, but will only rank 30 teams weekly during the season.

 Awards and honors 

 Ben Alsup 2010 SEC Tournament All-Tournament Team
 Paul Bertuccini 2010 ESPN The Magazine Academic All-American
 Blake Dean 2010 Collegiate Baseball Newspaper Second Team Pre-Season All-American
 2010 Rivals.com Pre-Season All-American
 2010 Golden Spikes Award Watch List
 2010 SEC Tournament All-Tournament Team
 Matt Gaudet 2010 Second Team All-SEC Selection
 Micah Gibbs 2010 Collegiate Baseball Newspaper Second Team Pre-Season All-American
 2010 Baseball America First Team Pre-Season All-American
 2010 Golden Spikes Award Watch List
 2010 Johnny Bench Award Watchlist
 2010 First Team All-SEC Selection
 2010 All-SEC Defensive Team Selection
 2010 Johnny Bench Award Semifinalist
 Tyler Hanover 2010 SEC Tournament All-Tournament Team

 Leon Landry 2010 Baseball America Third Team Pre-Season All-American
 2010 Golden Spikes Award Watch List
 Mikie Mahtook 2010 SEC Tournament All-Tournament Team
 Austin Nola 2010 Second Team All-SEC Selection
 2010 SEC Tournament All-Tournament Team
 2010 SEC Tournament MVP
 Matty Ott 2010 Collegiate Baseball Newspaper Second Team Pre-Season All-American
 2010 Stopper of the Year Watch List
 2010 Rivals.com Pre-Season All-American
 Anthony Ranaudo'''
 Collegiate Baseball Newspaper Preseason National Player of the Year
 2010 Collegiate Baseball Newspaper First Team Pre-Season All-American
 2010 Baseball America First Team Pre-Season All-American
 2010 Rivals.com Pre-Season All-American
 2010 Golden Spikes Award Watch List
 2010 SEC Baseball Service Team

LSU Tigers in the 2010 Major League Baseball Draft 
The following members and future members (denoted by *) of the LSU Tigers baseball program were drafted in the 2010 MLB Draft.

References 

LSU Tigers baseball seasons
Lsu Tigers Baseball Team, 2010
Southeastern Conference baseball champion seasons
LSU
LSU